The 2006 Saudi Arabia LG Cup was an exhibition association football tournament that took place in Saudi Arabia. South Korea won the tournament with four points.

Participants
The participants were:

Results

Final standings

Matches

Statistics

Goalscorers

See also
LG Cup

References

External links
Results

International association football competitions hosted by Saudi Arabia
2005–06 in Saudi Arabian football
2005–06 in Greek football
2005 in Ecuadorian football